Chungju Ji clan is one of the Korean clans. Their Bon-gwan is in Chungju, North Chungcheong Province. According to the research held in 2015, the number of Chungju Ji clan’s member was 148144. Their founder was  who was the Chinese envoy dispatched to Goryeo from Song dynasty in 960. His lineage can be traced back to Prince Chi of Qin, the son of King Huiwen. Ji Jong hae founded Chungju Ji clan and made Chungju, Chungju Ji clan’s Bon-gwan.

See also 
 Korean clan names of foreign origin

References

External links 
 

 
Ji clans
Korean clan names of Chinese origin